, also called  (literally "duck game"), is a game played on horseback that combines elements from polo and basketball. Since 1953 it has been the national sport of Argentina.

 is Spanish for "duck", as early games used a live duck inside a basket instead of a ball. Accounts of early versions of pato have been written since 1610. The playing field would often stretch the distance between neighboring  (ranches). The first team to reach its own  (ranch house) with the duck would be declared the winner.

 was banned several times during its history because of the violence—not only to the duck; many gauchos were trampled underfoot, and many more died in knife fights started in the heat of the game. In 1796, a Catholic priest insisted that  players who died in such a way should be denied Christian burial.

During the 1930s,  was regulated through the efforts of ranch owner Alberto del Castillo Posse, who drafted a set of rules inspired by modern polo. The game gained legitimacy, to the point that President Juan Perón declared  to be Argentina's national game in 1953.

In modern , two four-member teams riding on horses fight for possession of a ball which has six conveniently-sized handles, and score by throwing the ball through a vertically positioned ring (as opposed to the horizontal rim used in basketball). The rings have a 100 cm (3.3 ft) diameter, and are located atop 240 cm (7.9 ft) high poles. A closed net, extending for 140 cm (4.6 ft), holds the ball after goals are scored.

The winner is the team with most goals scored after regulation time (six 8-minute "periods").

The dimensions of the field are: length 180 to 220 m (196.9 to 240.6 yd), width 80 to 90 m (87 to 98 yd). The ball is made of leather, with an inflated rubber chamber and six leather handles. Its diameter is 40 cm (15.7 in) handle-to-handle and its weight is 1050 to 1250 g (2.3 to 2.8 lbs).

The tug is usually the most exciting part of the game.

 is played competitively and also by amateurs, mostly in weekend fairs which usually include  (Argentine rodeo). Its status as the national game of Argentina has been challenged by association football, which is much more widespread. While virtually the entire population of the country are avid football fans and players, it is estimated that 90% of Argentines have not seen a  match, and there are only a few thousand players of the game. In light of this, a bill was introduced in the Argentine legislature in 2010 to elevate football to the status of national sport and reduce  to a traditional sport. Defenders of '''s official status point out that it is a completely indigenous game, while football was imported.'' is similar to the game of horseball played in France, Portugal, and other countries.

References

External links
Federación Argentina de Pato y Horseball 

Equestrian team sports
National symbols of Argentina
Sport in Argentina
Sports originating in Argentina
Obsolete blood sports